Felipe Melo de Carvalho (born 26 June 1983), known as Felipe Melo, is a Brazilian professional footballer who plays as a defensive midfielder for Fluminense.

He began his career with Campeonato Brasileiro Série A teams Flamengo, Cruzeiro and Grêmio, before moving to Spain in 2005, where he represented Mallorca, Racing Santander and Almería in La Liga. After one year at Fiorentina, he signed for Juventus for €25 million in 2009. Felipe Melo spent four seasons at Galatasaray, playing 154 total games and winning eight honours, including three Süper Lig titles. After a spell back in Serie A with Inter Milan, he returned to Brazil in 2017 by signing for Palmeiras, where he soon won the Campeonato Brasileiro Série A in 2018.

Felipe Melo was a Brazilian international from 2009 to 2010, earning 22 caps and scoring two goals. He was part of their squads that won the 2009 FIFA Confederations Cup and reached the quarter-finals of the 2010 FIFA World Cup.

Club career

Brazil
Felipe Melo began his career for Flamengo, where he made 69 appearances and scored no goals in his two-season spell with the club. Following impressive performances with Flamengo, Melo transferred to Cruzeiro in the summer of 2003, but would remain for just one season. In his single season with Cruzeiro, Melo managed to make 31 league appearances, scoring two goals. Following yet another impressive season in Brazil, he was sold to Grêmio.

Following his transfer to Grêmio, Melo managed to make an additional 19 appearances and adding three goals to his tally in his native Brazil. He would only remain in Porto Alegre for 2004, because Grêmio was relegated that year and the team was dismantled.

Spain
In January 2005, Felipe Melo moved abroad for the first time, joining Spanish La Liga club Mallorca, who released Andrija Delibašić to give him a place. He played only eight times for the Balearic team, his season ending through knee ligament injury against Valencia in March; they narrowly avoided relegation.

Ahead of the 2005–06 season, Melo moved to fellow league team Racing de Santander. He scored his first goal for them on 21 December, in a 2–1 win away to Real Madrid at the Santiago Bernabéu.

On 3 July 2007, Felipe Melo became Almería's first signing ahead of their debut top-flight season. The transfer, which involved buying some of his rights from a third-party owner, was the most expensive in the club's history. He was a regular in midfield for Unai Emery's team, contributing seven goals as the Andalusians finished 8th.

Fiorentina
After a successful first season at Almería, Felipe Melo agreed to transfer to Italian side Fiorentina in a reported €13 million transfer for the 2008–09 season. Having held Spanish nationality since the 2007–08 season, he was not counted as a non-EU player in the Italian Serie A.

He made his debut in the first leg of the third qualifying round of the UEFA Champions League against Slavia Prague, and scored his first goal in a Viola shirt against Atalanta in the Serie A. After a very impressive debut season in the Serie A, which included 29 appearances and two goals, the Brazilian transferred to Juventus in Turin.

Juventus

On 30 June 2009, following a lauded performance with Brazil at the 2009 FIFA Confederations Cup, Felipe Melo signed a new five-year contract with Fiorentina, with a release clause of €25 million. At this point, Arsenal was reportedly in negotiations to sign the player. Within days, however, Melo was the subject of a bid from Juventus. The two rival clubs eventually agreed a fee of €25 million in total and Juve's Marco Marchionni joined Fiorentina on 15 July 2009 for a tagged price of €4.5 million. Later, Cristiano Zanetti, tagged for €2 million, re-joined Fiorentina. This allowed Juve to pay Fiorentina €18.5 million in three instalments.

The first half of the 2009–10 season was one to forget despite a bright start to his Juve career. He scored his first Juve goal against top-of-the-table rivals Roma in a 3–1 win. In the December Derby d'Italia fixture at home, he was controversially sent off for a supposed elbow at Internazionale's Mario Balotelli. The incident sparked a fiery argument between his teammate Gianluigi Buffon and Inter midfielder Thiago Motta, and both had to be separated by Inter and Juve players. Due to his poor performances throughout the season, he won the Bidone d'Oro Award in 2009, which was given to the worst Serie A player during a particular season. Melo was instrumental in his side's win over Milan at the San Siro in the 2010–11 season, and was later voted man of the match.

Galatasaray

On 22 July 2011, Felipe Melo joined Galatasaray in Turkey on a season-long loan deal for €1.5 million, with an option to transfer permanently at the end of the season for €13 million. He agreed on a contract with a net annual salary of €3.3 million plus a per-appearance bonus of €30,000, replacing departed Lorik Cana as the club's new central midfielder. He was attributed to the nickname "Pitbull" by the team supporters because of his passionate playing style, which also helped him become a fans favourite quickly; it is said that he displayed the mutual respect back with his tattoo of the club's mascot, a lion, on his arm. This is not true, however, because in his own statement, he states that this is a coincidence and that he got the tattoo due to the fact that in Brazil, a lion is a symbol for Jesus Christ.

Felipe Melo scored his first goal on 18 September 2011 from a 35-metre-long shot against Samsunspor. He scored 12 goals in 36 league matches, and at the end of the season, he was among the champion squad.

Felipe Melo had been expected to make a permanent move to Galatasaray, but on 24 July, transfer fee negotiations between the club and Juventus broke down due to the Turkish club requesting a lower fee for the player. On 14 August, the two clubs were able to agree another loan deal sending Melo to Turkey for the 2012–13 season, for €1.75 million, with the agreement including "the option, to be exercised by Galatasaray by 30 April 2013, for the permanent acquisition of the player for a price of €6.5 million". Melo also had a wage cut to €2.9 million with an appearances-based bonus of €25,000.

On 24 November, in a game between Galatasaray and Elazığspor in the Süper Lig, Felipe Melo went in goal and saved a penalty, after regular keeper Fernando Muslera had committed a foul and been sent off after Galatasaray had already used all their substitutions.

On 20 July 2013, Felipe Melo made a permanent move to Galatasaray on a three-year contract worth €3.1 million plus bonuses, while the transfer fee was reduced to €3.75 million plus bonuses of a maximum €500,000, which the club activated. He made his 100th appearance for the club on 2 February 2014 in Süper Lig encounter against Bursaspor in a 6–0 home win.

On 13 August 2015, Melo signed a four-year contract extension; during the first season of said contract, the yearly salary remained unchanged at €3.1 million, but was set to be reduced to €2.6 million for next three seasons. As of 2015, he is the most decorated Brazilian player in Turkish domestic competitions, winning seven cups, beating the record of his fellow countryman and ex-Galatasaray goalkeeper Cláudio Taffarel.

Internazionale
On 31 August 2015, Felipe Melo returned to Italy to sign with Internazionale on a 2-year contract and a €3.7 million transfer fee, plus €500,000 bonuses for each UEFA Champions League group stage qualification of the club, up to the 2017–18 season. Melo also received  €657,500 from Galatasaray. He officially returned to Serie A play on 23 September 2015 against Hellas Verona, against which he also scored his first goal for Inter.

Palmeiras 
On 8 January 2017, Sociedade Esportiva Palmeiras announced the signing of Felipe Melo on a 3-year contract. Four days later Inter Milan announced that it was a loan until 30 June, with Melo's contract with Inter set to expire on the same day.

International career
Felipe Melo made his senior international debut for Brazil on 10 February 2009 against Italy in a friendly, a match Brazil won 2–0. On 1 April 2009, he scored his first goal for his country against Peru in a 3–0 World Cup qualification victory.

Felipe Melo was named to the Brazilian squad for the 2009 FIFA Confederations Cup in South Africa, playing in every match of the tournament for his side and scoring the opener in a 3–0 group stage win against the United States. Brazil would again beat the U.S. in the final to win a third consecutive Confederations Cup title.

Felipe Melo was named in Brazil's final 23-man squad for the 2010 FIFA World Cup. In Brazil's quarter-final against the Netherlands in Port Elizabeth, he provided the assist for Robinho's tenth-minute opener, before Melo himself slightly touched a Wesley Sneijder cross, which at first was recorded as an own goal, but later credited to Sneijder. Sneijder then put the Dutch 2–1 ahead, before Melo was then sent off by referee Yuichi Nishimura in the 73rd minute for a violent stamp on Dutch winger Arjen Robben. On Brazil's return home after the World Cup, Felipe Melo took the brunt of the criticism of the fans as they threw insults, pushed and shoved towards the players.

Style of play
A quick, strong, tenacious, yet talented midfielder, Felipe Melo is known in particular for his hard-working, energetic, physical, and hard-tackling playing style, which has earned him the nicknames Pitbull and Gladiator, while in 2015 his Inter manager at the time, Roberto Mancini, described Melo and his teammate Gary Medel as warriors. He is able to play as a central or box-to-box midfielder, but is usually deployed as a defensive midfielder, where his stamina, power, tactical intelligence, and ball-winning abilities aid him in breaking down opposing plays, while his good all-round skills, first touch, and passing allow him subsequently to distribute the ball to his more offensive-minded teammates. In addition to his defensive attributes, he is also known for his dynamism and ability to make late runs into the area from midfield, which occasionally enables him to provide an additional attacking outlet to his teams. Throughout his career, Melo has stood out for his leadership on the pitch, although he has also equally been criticised for his aggression and tendency to pick up cards.

Personal life
Felipe Melo is married to Roberta, and they have one daughter (Pietra) and three sons, Davi, Linyker (who he named after the English centre forward Gary Lineker), and Bernardo.

On 18 June 2013, through Twitter and Facebook, Felipe Melo offended Renato Maurício Prado, a pundit of the Fox Sports channel. Among another names callings, Melo called Prado "coward", "arsehole" and "the most famous cuckold of sporting journalism". Prado sued Melo in August.

On 4 June 2014, Felipe Melo was on vacation with his family and friend in Las Vegas. Whilst enjoying dinner with his family and friends, a former football player and his friend handed Melo a hand-written paper stating "Sampiyon Fenerbahçe – which means Champion Fenerbahçe". Fenerbahçe, the main opponent of Galatasaray, had finished as Turkish Süper Lig champions for the 2013–14 season, which had just concluded. Melo responded to the note by showing the two his middle finger and by kicking one of them. The case was taken to American police.

Felipe Melo endorsed Jair Bolsonaro in the 2018 Brazilian presidential election. He dedicated his winning goal against Chapecoense in October 2019 to the president, a fan of Palmeiras.

Career statistics

Club
.

International
Source:

International goals
Scores and results list Brazil's goal tally first.

Honours
Flamengo
Campeonato Carioca: 2001
Copa dos Campeões: 2001

Cruzeiro
Série A: 2003

Galatasaray
Süper Lig: 2011–12, 2012–13, 2014–15
Turkish Cup: 2013–14, 2014–15
Turkish Super Cup: 2012, 2013, 2015

Palmeiras
Copa Libertadores: 2020, 2021
Série A: 2018
Copa do Brasil: 2020
Campeonato Paulista: 2020

Fluminense
Campeonato Carioca: 2022

Brazil
FIFA Confederations Cup: 2009

Individual
Sambafoot Brazilian Player of the Year: 2012, 2013 (fourth place)
Campeonato Paulista Team of the year: 2017, 2018

References

External links

 
 
 
 News about the Felipe Melo (Turkish Version)
 
 Profile at Galatasaray.org
 
 
 

1983 births
Living people
People from Volta Redonda
Campeonato Brasileiro Série A players
La Liga players
Serie A players
Süper Lig players
CR Flamengo footballers
Cruzeiro Esporte Clube players
Grêmio Foot-Ball Porto Alegrense players
Sociedade Esportiva Palmeiras players
Fluminense FC players
Racing de Santander players
RCD Mallorca players
UD Almería players
ACF Fiorentina players
Juventus F.C. players
Galatasaray S.K. footballers
Inter Milan players
Brazilian footballers
Brazilian expatriate footballers
Expatriate footballers in Spain
Expatriate footballers in Italy
Expatriate footballers in Turkey
Brazil international footballers
2009 FIFA Confederations Cup players
Copa Libertadores-winning players
FIFA Confederations Cup-winning players
Brazilian Christians
2010 FIFA World Cup players
Brazilian expatriate sportspeople in Turkey
Association football midfielders
Outfield association footballers who played in goal
Sportspeople from Rio de Janeiro (state)